Eyes & Nines is the third studio album by American hardcore punk band Trash Talk. It was released on May 18, 2010 digitally and June 8, 2010 on CD/LP by the band's own record label Trash Talk Collective.

On February 3 they stated on their blog 'Manifest Destination' that they had been hard at work writing and recording the album 'Eyes & Nines'. The album was available for preorder, and those who did so received a digital copy of the single 'Explode' and the music video for the single instantly.

Track listing

Personnel
Lee Spielman - Vocals
Garrett Stevenson - Guitar
Spencer Pollard - Bass and Vocals
Sam Bosson - Drums
Greg Hetson - Additional guitar in "Vultures"
Matt Caughthran - Additional vocals in "Explode" and "Rabbit Holes"
Luis Hernandez - Additional vocals in "Hash Wednesday" and "On A Fix"
Jorma Vik - Additional percussion in "Eyes & Nines"
Joby J. Ford - Producer
Dave Schiffman - Mixing
Beau Burchell - Mastering

Chart positions

References

2010 albums
Trash Talk (band) albums